Jackson Hill (born 1941 in Birmingham, Alabama), is an American composer primarily of symphonic, ensemble, and vocal music.

Biography
Hill was a Morehead Scholar at the University of North Carolina at Chapel Hill (Ph.D. in musicology in 1970). A composer from the age of 14, he studied composition with Iain Hamilton at Duke University (1964–66) and Roger Hannay (1967-68). He has served as a visiting scholar and choral assistant at Exeter College, Oxford, and as a visiting fellow at Clare Hall, Cambridge University.  He studied Buddhist chant as a Fulbright Fellow in Japan in the 1970s, and traditional Japanese music has been a strong influence in his work.

He has received numerous awards and prizes for his music, which includes choral, solo, and chamber music, as well as a chamber opera and three symphonies.  Hill’s music has been widely performed in Europe, Asia and the Americas, including performances at the Tanglewood, Ravinia, Chautauqua, and Edinburgh festivals.  Recent commissions have come from The Fitzwilliam String Quartet (UK), Lichfield Cathedral, Chanticleer, the King's Singers, New York Polyphony, and the Three Choirs Festival (UK).  His composition Voices of Autumn was part of Chanticleer’s Grammy nomination in 2003.  He taught at Duke University (1966-1968) and 1968-2008 at Bucknell University, where he served as Associate Dean, Presidential Professor, and Chair of the Department of Music.

Compositions
Hill is internationally known for his contribution to the vocal idiom. Principal works include:

Music for orchestra
 Variations for Orchestra (1964)
 Mosaics (1965)
 Paganini Set (1973)
 Ceremonies of Spheres (1973)
 Sangraal (1977)
 Chambers (1988)
 Toccata Nipponica (1989)
 Secrets (Himitsu) (1990) 
 Symphony No. 1 (Sinfonia Nipponica) (1990)
 Symphony No. 2 (Sinfonia Canonica) (1996)
 Symphony No. 3 (Sinfonia Romantica) (1997)

Ensemble music
 Serenade (1970) flute / violin / cello / piano
 Remembered Landscape (1984) violin / viola / cello / piano
 Tholos (1991) flute / oboe / clar / violin / cello / piano / percussion
 Trio da Camera (1993) flute / oboe / cello
 Threnody (2005) horn / string quartet
 Ghosts (2010) string quartet

Music for solo voice
 Love Parting (1987) song cycle for voice / piano
 The Streams of Love (1989) voice / viola / piano
 Long hidden deep in winter's keeping (2001) voice / string quartet 
 Philomel (2002) voice / recorder / cello / harp
 El Duelo ("The Mourning") (2010) tenor / string quartet
 The Silent Ground (2010) voice / piano

Church music with English text
 By Water and the Word (1995) SATB / org
 The Gifts of the Spirit (1996) SATB / org 
 Praise, O Praise the Lord (1997) SATB / org 
 A Song of Pilgrimage (1997) SATB 
 How Shall the Young (2000) SATB / org
 The St. Chad Magnificat and Nunc dimittis (Lichfield Service) (2003)
 Where Cross the Crowded Ways of Life (2010) SATB / org

Church music with Latin text
 O Salutaris (1973)
 Tantum Ergo (1974) Peters Edition
 Missa Brevis (1974) SATB, Peters Edition
 Three Motets (1977) SATB Peters edition
 Hodie Christus Natus Est (1982) SATB
 Sacris sollemniis (1992) SATB
 Populus Sion, ecce Dominus (1994) SATB

Choral concert music
 Voices of Autumn (1982) SATB
 O Light Invisible (1994) SATB
 In Winter's Keeping (2001) 
 Remembered Love (2004) AATBBB
 When spring is born at last (2004) SATB
 Summer Dreams (2006) SSAATTBB
 A Haunted Melancholy (2008) SSAATBB
 Ma fin est mon commencement (2009) ATBB
 Still, in Remembrance (Elegy for 9/11) (2011) SSAATTBB
 To Hold the Light (2013) SSAATTBB
 No Traveler More Blest (2014) SATB
 Wings of Thy Dark Soul (2014) SATB

See also
Composer's homepage
Sounds Choral Interview aired on WWFM 29 April 2018
ArtScene Interview aired on WVIA 4 September 2019

References
The New Grove Dictionary of Music and Musicians (Second Edition, 2000), American Music Center (New York), S.A.I. Composers Bureau Online, The New Grove Dictionary of American Music, International Who's Who in Music and Musicians Directory, ASCAP Symphonic Catalogue, Who's Who in Entertainment, International Who's Who in Classical Music

1941 births
Living people
21st-century American composers
21st-century American male musicians
American male composers
Musicians from Birmingham, Alabama
Duke University alumni
University of North Carolina at Chapel Hill alumni